Conkling Cavern is a paleontological and archaeological site located in Doña Ana County, New Mexico. It was excavated in the late 1920s under the direction of Chester Stock. Unfortunately, Stock never published the fossil fauna from the excavations. Instead, R. P. Conkling, who had drawn scientific attention to the site, published very preliminary lists of mammals identified by Stock and birds identified by Howard. Several authors have done research on portions of the recovered fossil fauna. Excavated before modern dating techniques were developed, little is known about the chronology except some apparently is Holocene and much is Pleistocene in age.

The site is located on the east side of Bishop's Cap, an outlier of the Organ Mountains. The entrance to the cavern is essentially vertical. The cave was described by Conkling as having been filled originally to 8 feet below the entrance. A vertical section of the cave is pictured in the Conkling paper from a photograph of an exhibit that had been displayed  at the Natural History Museum of Los Angeles County.

The Conkling Cavern material was deposited at that museum. Some additional material has since been recovered from spoil from the original excavations and is housed in the Paleobiology Collection, UTEP Biodiversity Collections, Department of Biological Sciences, and Centennial Museum and Chihuahuan Desert Gardens, University of Texas at El Paso. The faunal list includes identifications from all known collections.

Fragments of two humans were recovered, including parts of two skulls. One of these was at a depth of about 12 feet and the other at about 26 feet, about 26 inches beneath a layer of consolidated sandstone. The upper skull part was close to the ungual phalanges of a sloth. Gnawed human bones were found deeper in what was thought to be a dire wolf den.

Names have been changed to the current nomenclature. Keep in mind that identifications are tentative and some may be Holocene rather than Pleistocene.

Fauna
Reptilia
Tortoise
Snake

Aves
 Branta canadensis
 Cathartes aura
 †Coragyps occidentalis
 Gymnogyps californianus
 Buteo jamaicensis
 Buteo swainsoni
 Haliaeetus leucocephalus
 Aquila chrysaetos
 Caracara cheriway prelutosus
 Falco sparverius
 Centrocercus urophasianus
 Callipepla ? gambeli
 Meleagris gallopavo
 †Geococcyx californianus conklingi
 Tyto alba
 Speotyto cunicularia
 Asio otus
 Colaptes auratus 
 Eremophila alpestris
 Corvus corax
 Gymnorhynus cyanocephalus
 Turdus migratorius
 Sialia sp.
 Agelaius ? phoeniceus
 Carpodacus mexicanus
 Pipilo erythrophthalmus

Mammalia
 Homo sapiens
 ? †Mylodon sp.
 ? †Megalonyx sp.
 †Nothrotheriops sp.
 Lepus sp.
 Sylvilagus cf. audubonii
 Sylvilagus nuttallii/floridanus
 Spermophilus sp.
 Tamias cf. cinereicollis
 Cynomys cf. ludovicianus
 Dipodomys sp.
 Thomomys bottae
 Geomys sp.
 Microtus mogollonensis
 Peromyscus sp.
 †Canis dirus
 Canis latrans
 Vulpes velox
 Urocyon sp.
 Bassariscus sp.
 †Arctodus
 Mustela sp.
 Spilogale sp.
 Mephitis mephitis
 Taxidea sp.
 Puma concolor
 Lynx cf rufus
 †Equus sp.
 †Hemiauchenia sp.
 †Camelops hesternus
 Antilocapra sp.
 †Stockoceros sp. [as †Tetrameryx]
 †Capromeryx sp.
 Bison sp.

References
Brattstrom, B. H. 1964. Amphibians and reptiles from cave deposits in south-central New Mexico. Bulletin of the Southern California Academy of Sciences 63:93-103.
Conkling, R. P. 1932. Conkling Cavern: The discoveries in the bone cave at Bishops Cap, New Mexico. West Texas Historical and  Scientific Society, Bulletin 44:6-19.
Howard, H. 1931. A new species of road-runner from Quaternary cave deposits in New Mexico. Condor, 33:206-209.
Howard, H., and A. H. Miller. 1933. Bird remains from cave deposits in New Mexico. Condor 35:15-18.
Rea, A. M. 1980. Late Pleistocene and Holocene turkeys in the Southwest. Contributions in Science, Natural History Museum of Los Angeles County 330:209-224.
Smartt, R. A. 1977. The ecology of Late Pleistocene and Recent Microtus from south-central and southwestern New Mexico. Southwestern Naturalist 22:1-19.
Stock, C. 1931. Occurrence of human remains in Conkling Cavern, New Mexico. Abstract, Geological Society of America, Bulletin 42:370.

Web Reference
 Conkling Cavern

Cenozoic paleontological sites of North America
Paleozoology
Caves of New Mexico
Archaeological sites in New Mexico
Landforms of Doña Ana County, New Mexico
Organ Mountains–Desert Peaks National Monument
Paleontology in New Mexico
Pleistocene paleontological sites